German submarine U-445 was a Type VIIC U-boat of Nazi Germany's Kriegsmarine during World War II.

She carried out nine patrols. She sank no ships.

She was a member of six wolfpacks.

She was sunk in the Bay of Biscay by a British warship on 24 August 1944.

Design
German Type VIIC submarines were preceded by the shorter Type VIIB submarines. U-445 had a displacement of  when at the surface and  while submerged. She had two shafts and two  propellers.

U-445 was fitted with five  torpedo tubes (four fitted at the bow and one at the stern), fourteen torpedoes, one  SK C/35 naval gun, 220 rounds, and a  C/30 anti-aircraft gun. The boat had a complement of between forty-four and sixty.

Service history
The submarine was laid down on 9 April 1941 at Schichau-Werke in Danzig (now Gdansk, Poland) as yard number 1505, launched on 19 March 1942 and commissioned on 30 May under the command of Oberleutnant zur See Heinz-Konrad Fenn.

She served with the 8th U-boat Flotilla from 30 May 1942 for training and the 6th flotilla from 1 November 1942 for operations.

First patrol
U-432s first patrol was preceded by the short journey from Kiel in Germany to Marviken. The patrol itself commenced with her departure from Marviken on 8 November 1942. She proceeded via the gap separating the Faroe and Shetland Islands and into the Atlantic Ocean. She arrived at St. Nazaire in occupied France on 3 January 1943.

Second and third patrols
Her second sortie was carried out north of the Azores and west of Gibraltar.

The submarine's third patrol was relatively uneventful.

Fourth and fifth patrols
The boat's fourth patrol was, at 68 days, her longest. It took her to the west coast of Africa. The most southerly point, between South America and Africa, was reached on 12 August 1943.

She was attacked on patrol number five by a Handley Page Halifax of No. 58 Squadron RAF in the western Bay of Biscay on 2 January 1944. No damage was sustained.

Sixth patrol
She fired at what her crew thought was a destroyer west of Ireland on 14 February 1944. Retaliation was swift; the Third Support Group caused severe damage, but the U-boat escaped.

Seventh and eighth patrols
U-445s seventh outing was relatively short, from 6–15 June 1944. She did not leave the Bay of Biscay, but she did move to La Pallice, south of St. Nazaire.

Her eighth patrol was also brief and entailed another move; this time to Lorient.

Ninth patrol and loss
U-445 was sunk in the Bay of Biscay by depth charges dropped by the British frigate  on 24 August 1944.

Fifty-two men died; there were no survivors.

Wolfpacks
U-445 took part in six wolfpacks, namely:
 Drachen (22 November – 3 December 1942)
 Panzer (3 – 9 December 1942)
 Büffel (9 – 15 December 1942)
 Ungestüm (15 – 25 December 1942)
 Robbe (16 February – 13 March 1943)
 Igel 2 (6 – 14 February 1944)

References

Bibliography

External links

German Type VIIC submarines
U-boats commissioned in 1942
U-boats sunk in 1944
U-boats sunk by depth charges
1942 ships
Ships built in Danzig
Ships lost with all hands
U-boats sunk by British warships
World War II submarines of Germany
Maritime incidents in August 1944
Ships built by Schichau